Jorge Augusto Fernandes (born 11 January 1986), known as Djô, is a Portuguese futsal player who plays for Leões Porto Salvo and the Portugal national team.

External links
Sporting CP profile 
FPF national team profile 
FPF club profile 

1986 births
Living people
Portuguese men's futsal players
Cape Verdean men's futsal players
Sporting CP futsal players
Sportspeople from Praia
Cape Verdean emigrants to Portugal